Giulio Cesare Cortese (1570 in Naples, Italy – 22 December 1622 in Naples)  was an Italian author and poet.

Life
Born to a well-to-do family, nothing is known of Cortese's early life, though it is thought that he was a schoolmate of Giambattista Basile.  Receiving a degree in law, he tried life as a courtier in Spain and Florence, without any great success.  Cortese apparently had some success in the Medici court as he was sent in 1599 to Spain as a member of a Medici delegation for the marriage of Philip III of Spain with Margherita of Austria.  In his "Tuscan" rhymes there is a fruitless attempt to catch the attention of the Counts of Lemos, the foremost representatives of the Spanish crown in Naples.
He was a close friend of Luigi Caponaro, who he frequently cites in his work.
Regardless of his commemoration by Basile in 1627, it is generally believed, due to several handwritten manuscripts, that Cortese lived at least until 1640 and it is consequently believed that he attended and perhaps participated in his own funeral.  
Cortese is very important for Baroque and dialectical literature, in that, with Basile, he laid the foundations for the artistic and literary dignity of the Neapolitan language as opposed to the Tuscan dialect in which Cortese had also produced a number of largely laudatory works.

Works

The Vaiasseide
A mock-heroic poem in five cantos, where the lyric meter and the heroic themes are lowered to the level of the protagonists: a group of vaiasse, common Neapolitan women who express themselves in dialect.  Its writing is comic and transgressive, where much importance is given to the participation of the plebeian choir in the mechanics of the action.
The reader is literally catapulted into the day-to-day life of the vaiasse where the main element is the investigation of the world through which Cortese makes into a world which is not his own and which he describes with irony and tragedy.

The Voyage in Parnassus
This work, in dialect, is a diagnosis of the condition of literature and of people of letters, with a variety of autobiographical allusions, filled with bitterness and pessimism.
The whole thing is situated in Parnassus where Apollo and his Muses reside and where the poet can set forth the sins of poetry, carried out in a degraded society, where the order of the day is the crime of plagiarism.  The whole resolves itself with a fairytale ending and the bitter disillusionment of the poet who see all of his ambitions coming to naught.

References

External links
 
 

Neapolitan language
Italian poets
Italian male poets
1570 births
1640 deaths